The following highways are numbered 642:

United States